Travelling Without Moving is the third studio album by English funk and acid jazz band Jamiroquai, released on 28 August 1996 in Japan, then on 9 September 1996 in the United Kingdom under Sony Soho Square. Front-man Jay Kay intended for the album to have a more universal style, revolving around "cars, life and love". Critics have generally praised the album for being more focused and refined than the band's previous work while others panned its lyrics and found the album too derivative. Kay also faced backlash from press for his use of sports cars in this period despite his environmental beliefs.

The album was Jamiroquai's American breakthrough. It marked the band's first entry in the US Billboard 200 chart at number 24. In the UK, it peaked at number two. Its singles "Virtual Insanity", "Cosmic Girl" and "Alright" entered the top-ten in the UK singles chart. In the US, "Alright" entered the Billboard Hot 100 at number 78, while "Cosmic Girl" and "High Times" were in the top-ten in the Dance Club Songs charts. The music video for "Virtual Insanity" contributed to the album's success. Travelling Without Moving sold over 8 million copies worldwide, holding the Guinness World Records as the best-selling funk album in history. The album was reissued in 2013 in remastered form with bonus material.

Background
After experiencing a stressful period while recording The Return of the Space Cowboy, Kay sought to make the next album more focused and universal. He also did not want to remain as a semi-underground act "that stuck to its little niche and sold one and a half million albums every time. I wanted to breakout and be something bigger, more international." Speaking of the album's general mood, Kay said: "[With Emergency on Planet Earth], people weren't cheering in the streets or anything, and [The Return of the Space Cowboy] was quite sad. With [Travelling Without Moving], I decided it was important to show people we could enjoy ourselves. That's why it's cars, life and love". Kay booked the band into the residential studio Great Linford Manor so that they could work at their own pace.

Composition
The first song composed for the album was "Virtual Insanity". It was recorded as a rough demo and was not fully realised until the album's final recording stage. The song has a piano opening with "buoyant keyboards and soaring strings." Its lyrics are about the prevalence of technology and the replication and simulation of life. The second track "Cosmic Girl" is a disco song with "spacey" lyrics, based on rhythmic "looped beats" "to give it an off-center, otherworldly" sound. For the next track "Use The Force" the group channels "that real vintage football vibe", filled with horns, wah-wah guitar and a rippling barrage of Latin percussion". The fourth track "Everyday" is described "as seductive as any Maxwell ballad" and has "over aching strings and a come-hither bass line". The fifth song, "Alright", was described as an "easy-going disco-funk" track.

"High Times", a song with "razor-edged funky guitars", references Kay's drug use during the recording of The Return of the Space Cowboy: "'High Times' was admitting the truth of the matter, of where I'd been and how lucky I was to be coming out of the other side." This is followed by the reggae track, "Drifting Along". The tracks "Didjerema" and "Didjital Vibrations" are instrumental tracks containing ambient didgeridoo. The title track is next on the album and samples Kay's purple Lamborghini in the intro. It features a "driving groove" and after two minutes, it "transitions into a bassline-paced, heavy workout". The album ends with the dance track, "You Are My Love", and the soul ballad, "Spend A Lifetime".

Release
Travelling Without Moving was first released on 28 August 1996 in Japan, then on 9 September 1996 in the United Kingdom on Sony Soho Square. Released on the Work record label in January 1997, it was the band's first US Billboard 200 entry, where it reached number 24 and it sold 1,400,000 shipments. The album peaked at number 2 in the UK chart and sold 1,219,197 copies. In Japan, it reached number 6, and in the year end charts there, it ranked number 87 in 1996 and number 58 in 1997. It peaked at number 2 in the French SNEP Album charts and number 6 in the year end chart in 1996. In Switzerland, it reached number 3 in the Swiss Albums Charts, and number 37 in the year end chart in 1996. It ranked number 9 in the German Media Control Albums Chart, and It ranked at number 69 in 1996 and number 38 in 1997 in the German year end charts. In the Netherlands, in peaked at 16 in the album chart, and number 48 in the year end chart in 1997. In the Australian ARIA Albums chart, it ranked at 6 and in 1997 47 at the end of the year. The album was certified platinum in these countries, except in Germany where it was certified gold. It was also triple Platinum in Europe by the IFPI denoting sales of 3,000,000 copies. The album overall sold 8,000,000 copies worldwide. In 2013, Travelling Without Moving was one of the first three albums to be re-issued on the band's 20th anniversary campaign, also containing a bonus disc of remixes, demos, live performances and b-sides.

"Do U Know Where You're Coming From" was the first single to be released on 20 May 1996, where it peaked at number 12 in the UK. It is a drum and bass song by M-Beat which features vocals by Kay. The second single "Virtual Insanity" was released on 19 August 1996, reached number 3 in the single and number 1 the R&B charts in the UK. Its Jonathan Glazer directed music video played heavily on MTV, which depicted Kay "perform[ing] in a room where the floors, walls and furniture all moved simultaneously."
"Cosmic Girl" was released as its third single on 20 November 1996, reaching number 6 in the UK and number 7 in the US Dance Club Songs charts. Its music video features a Ferrari F355 Berlinetta, a red Ferrari F40 and a purple Lamborghini Diablo SE30 "on mountain roads and across a desert." "Alright" was issued on 28 April 1997, ranking number 6 in the UK and number 78 in their only [[Billboard Hot 100|Billboard Hot 100]] appearance. "High Times" was the final single, released on 1 December 1997, and peaked at number 9 the US Dance Club charts.

Controversy
After the album was released, Kay received backlash from the press for his interest in sports cars, because it contradicted his environmental beliefs on Emergency on Planet Earth. The album's visual concept revolved around sports cars, with the Ferrari logo being recreated within band's Buffalo Man logo. Paper magazine also pointed out this contradiction with the music video for "Alright", "when Kay rolls up in his purple Lamborghini to party on the dance floor with a bevy of bodacious babes, concerns about seals, whales, rain forests and the revolution are checked at the door." He said that he was hesitant to release the album as he expected the backlash, but added "Just because I love to drive a fast car, that doesn't mean I believe in chopping trees down. It doesn't mean I think they should build more roads for my car". Keyboardist Toby Smith also said "We all want to be an ecologically conscious band, but we like cars[…] We're hypocrites like the rest of the world. But then again, you can only drive one car at a time.

 Reception 

Critics have generally praised Travelling Without Moving for its focused and refined sound, as it deepened the acid-jazz and soul styles that were informed from their first two albums. Linton Chiswick of Q magazine said that this resulted in "a fat, squishy disco feel." Parry Gettelman also wrote that Kay had "evolved into quite a writer." The Source also gave the album 4 out of 5: "Travelling is essentially about the metaphysics of having a good time… Jamiroquai have a thousand musical tricks up their sleeves; edgy horns laced with jazz intricacies, energetic bass lines and disco rhythms, and a wider variety of tempos than usual in British funk." Tom Moon remarked that: "There are no digital samples on Traveling Without Moving. In fact, just about every sound comes from a vintage analog instrument."

Stephen Thompson of The A.V. Club said that the album "sounds an awful lot like its predecessor", but concluded: "It's a tribute to Jamiroquai that more of the same still sounds pretty damned good." A Music Week reviewer wrote: "Jamiroquai still wear their influences firmly on their sleeve but this is their most accomplished and satisfying offering yet." Matt Diehl of Entertainment Weekly writes, "when it comes to Stevie Wonder, frontman Jason Kay still gets imitation confused with homage." In a 2004 discography review by Ben Sisario, Travelling Without Moving is the only Jamiroquai album rated slightly higher than others, with Sisario singling out "Virtual Insanity" and "Cosmic Girl" for being radio-friendly, but criticising the album's use of the didgeridoo. David Bennun of Muzik considered it "tepid funk" in an unfavorable review. The album's lyrics have also been criticised, with Matt Diehl writing they "ultimately strip away the soul."

Accolades
For their single, "Virtual Insanity", the music video for it won Video of the Year and Breakthrough Video at the Video Music Awards, and Alternative/Modern Rock Clip of the Year and the Maximum Vision at the Billboard Music Awards. The song also earned the band a Grammy Award for Best Performance by a Duo Or Group and the album was nominated for Best Pop Vocal Album. Travelling Without Moving has won three best album awards at the MOBO and Japan Gold Disc Awards in 1997, and at the Hungarian Music Awards in 1998. Fnac listed the album in its 2008 list The 1000 Best Albums of All Time, in no order. Pause & Play ranked the album at number 11 in The 90s Top 100 Essential Albums in 1999. Studio Brussel included it in The 500 Greatest Albums of All Time in 2015. Vibe called Travelling Without Moving "the most infectious dance record since the 70’s disco revolution", and ranked it at number 42 in its 2013 list The 50 Greatest Albums Since '93.

Legacy
The high album sales of Travelling Without Moving earned the band a Guinness World Record for the best-selling funk album in history. Paul Sexton of Billboard magazine credits this period of Jamiroquai as their American breakthrough: "Long a European success story for the Sony S2 label, the group once accused of being a mere Stevie Wonder soundalike has grown into its own style and added a substantial American audience in the process." However, the band were unable replicate their success in America since then. The music video of "Virtual Insanity" was described as "one of the most famous music videos ever", making them "icons of the music-video format", according to Spencer Kornhaber from The Atlantic. The song also led to the climax of "1970s soul and funk that early acid jazz artists had initiated", according to writer Kennith Prouty. The Lamborghini Diablo SE30 was also considered a "Nineties icon" in part of the "Cosmic Girl" music video, according to The Daily Telegraph''.

Track listing

Notes 
  Some editions contain either "Do U Know Where You're Coming From" or "Funktion" as a bonus track. Others have both tracks.

Personnel
Credits adapted from album liner notes.

Jamiroquai
 Jay Kay
 Toby Smith
 Stuart Zender
 Derrick McKenzie
 Wallis Buchanan
 Simon Katz
 Sola Akingbola

Additional musicians
 DJ D-Zire
 Simon Hale – string arrangements and conductor
 Gavyn Wright and the London Philharmonic Orchestra – strings
 Max Beesley – vibraphone 
 Gary Barnacle - saxophone
 John Thirkell - trumpet
 Katie – backing vocals
 Beverly – backing vocals

Production
 AL Stone – production, engineering 
 Blue – design and art direction
 Lorenzo Agius – photography

Charts

Weekly charts

Year-end charts

Certifications and sales

!scope="row"|Worldwide
|
|8,000,000
|-

References

External links
 

Jamiroquai albums
1996 albums
Work Records albums
S2 Records albums
Music controversies